Sebastián Alejandro Simonet Moldes (born 12 May 1986) is an Argentine handball player for Ademar León and the Argentina men's national handball team.

He defended Argentina at the 2012 London Summer Olympics, along with his younger brother Diego, and the 2015 World Men's Handball Championship in Qatar.

Two of his brothers, Pablo and Diego, have defended Argentina at handball Olympic and World Championship competitions.

Individual awards and achievements
2016 Pan American Men's Handball Championship: Best playmaker
2018 Pan American Men's Handball Championship: Best playmaker

References

External links

1986 births
Living people
Argentine male handball players
Argentine people of French descent
Olympic handball players of Argentina
Handball players at the 2012 Summer Olympics
Handball players at the 2016 Summer Olympics
Sportspeople from Buenos Aires
Pan American Games silver medalists for Argentina
Pan American Games gold medalists for Argentina
Handball players at the 2011 Pan American Games
Handball players at the 2015 Pan American Games
Handball players at the 2019 Pan American Games
Pan American Games medalists in handball
Liga ASOBAL players
CB Ademar León players
Expatriate handball players
Argentine expatriate sportspeople in France
Argentine expatriate sportspeople in Spain
South American Games silver medalists for Argentina
South American Games medalists in handball
Competitors at the 2018 South American Games
Medalists at the 2015 Pan American Games
Medalists at the 2019 Pan American Games
Medalists at the 2011 Pan American Games
Handball players at the 2020 Summer Olympics
21st-century Argentine people